On January 11, 2015, the Dallas Cowboys and the Green Bay Packers played an NFC Divisional Playoff game at Lambeau Field in Green Bay, Wisconsin. The game gained notoriety after a play in which Cowboys wide receiver Dez Bryant attempted to catch a pass from quarterback Tony Romo in the closing minutes of the 4th quarter. The pass was initially ruled a catch before controversially being overturned after officials determined Bryant did not complete the process of a catch while he was lunging towards the end zone. The Packers would get the ball on the turnover on downs and run out the clock. They won by a score of 26–21 and moved on to the NFC Championship game. In the proceeding years, the National Football League (NFL) changed the rules regarding catching a pass while falling to the ground. The new rules would have given Bryant a completed catch. This game has gone by such names as "Dez Caught It" or the "No-Catch Game."

Background 
Both teams entered the playoffs at identical 12–4 records at the end of the NFL season.

The Cowboys entered as the 3rd seed after clinching the NFC East, making them the 10th non-repeat division champs since the 2004 season. Dallas won 5 out of their last 6 games after their bye week, which clinched the division and advanced them to the NFC Wild Card game, where they defeated the Detroit Lions to further advance to the NFC Divisional Playoff round. That game was not without its own controversy because of a pass interference flag that was called on Cowboys linebacker Anthony Hitchens when he seemingly interfered with Lions tight end Brandon Pettigrew. Back judge Lee Dyer threw his flag to signify defensive pass interference and head referee Pete Morelli initially announced the penalty. However, after conferring with head linesman Jerry Bergman, it was determined that Hitchens legally defended Pettigrew on the route. The flag was therefore picked up and the penalty waived off, causing the controversy. After the game, NFL Vice President of Officiating Dean Blandino stated that the no-call on pass interference was debatable, but defensive holding definitely should have been called on the play. The Cowboys won that game, 24–20.

The Packers entered the playoffs as the 2nd seed after clinching the NFC North division for the fourth year in a row, earning a first round bye. Green Bay, like Dallas, only lost one game after their own bye week, winning 7 out of 8. The Packers made the playoffs for the sixth straight season, tying the record set between 1993 and 1998.

This game would be the two teams' first meeting in the playoffs in 19 years, since the 1995 NFC Championship game, and the first playoff game in the rivalry played at Lambeau Field in 47 years, with the last being the legendary Ice Bowl.

Game summary

First half 
Both teams managed to score a touchdown in the first quarter. Green Bay scored first after a 10-play, 60-yard drive, with a 4-yard pass from Packers quarterback Aaron Rodgers to tight end Andrew Quarless. With 1:05 to go in the quarter, the Cowboys drove 62 yards in 12 plays, capped off by a 1-yard scoring pass from Tony Romo to fullback Tyler Clutts.

In the second quarter, both offenses continued to struggle. Wide receiver Terrance Williams took a Romo pass 38 yards into the endzone to give Dallas a 14–7 lead. A few drives later, the Cowboys were set up at the Packers 32-yard line for a Dan Bailey field goal attempt of 50 yards. However, the field goal was partially blocked by Datone Jones, resulting in the kick missing wide to the right. Taking over on their own 40, the Packers drove 38-yards to the Dallas 22-yard line, scoring on a 40-yard Mason Crosby field goal before the half ended, putting the score at 14–10 for the Cowboys.

Second half 
Getting the ball back to start the second half, the Packers continued on offense, but quickly had to punt after five plays. Dallas took over, but running back DeMarco Murray fumbled at the Cowboys' 41-yard line on a tackle by Julius Peppers, which was recovered by Datone Jones at the Dallas 44 yard line. Later in the drive, Crosby hit a 30-yard field goal to put the score at 14–13. With 7:46 left in the quarter, Dallas scored on a 6-play, 80-yard drive, capped off by a 1-yard run by Murray. Green Bay answered back with a 46-yard touchdown pass to Davante Adams on a 7-play drive to put the score at 21–20 to end the 3rd quarter.

Romo took two consecutive sacks from Nick Perry to end the 3rd and start the 4th quarters, which resulted in the Cowboys punting back to the Packers a few plays later. From their own 20, Rodgers took his offense on an 8-play, 80-yard drive, connecting on a 13-yard pass to Richard Rodgers II putting the score at 26–21. Green Bay attempted a two-point conversion, which failed.

With the Cowboys taking over from their own 18, their drive started with a 30-yard run by Murray to the Dallas 48. A Joseph Randle run, a 10-yard pass to Bryant, and a 2-yard Murray run put Dallas at the Green Bay 38-yard line. After Romo was sacked by Mike Neal, he connected with Cole Beasley for a 9-yard completion.

The controversial play 

Down by 5 with 4:42 left to go in the game, the Cowboys were facing 4th and 2 on the Packers' 32-yard line. Going for it, Romo threw a deep pass to Dez Bryant near the goal line. Being covered by cornerback Sam Shields, Bryant made a leaping catch over Shields, and in an attempt to secure the football for the catch and reach across the goal line for the touchdown, Bryant tucked the ball in his left arm by his elbow while extending out for the spot. The pass was initially ruled a completed catch with Bryant being downed at the Packers' 1-yard line. However, Packers head coach Mike McCarthy threw his challenge flag, arguing that the ball hit the ground before Bryant completed the process of a legal catch. After a review by Gene Steratore and the other officials, it was determined that Bryant did not properly secure the ball before it hit the ground, thus overturning the call and ruling the pass incomplete. Cowboys fans watching the game, angry at the call, would show their frustration by starting the Twitter hashtag #DezCaughtIt.

Turning the ball over on downs with 4:06 left to play, the Cowboys' offense would never get the ball back again. After a few more plays, involving a 26-yard pass to Davante Adams and a 12-yard pass to Randall Cobb, the Packers secured a 26–21 win, advancing to the NFC Championship. Rodgers finished with 316 yards and three touchdowns and no interceptions, while Romo finished with 191 yards, two touchdowns, and also no interceptions.

Aftermath 
Following the game, Bryant would describe the overturned catch to the media: "All I know is I had possession, I had possession of the ball coming down, that's possession, right? One, two, reach. Bam, that's possession. That's possession." In regards to the catch rule, Bryant expressed his disdain, stating, "I'm just begging them: please, please take that out. Take that rule out." Cowboys owner Jerry Jones would expand by saying, "any time we have interpretation in our rules, that happens. The judgment on the field, we have a principle that prevails, and it has to be overturned by pretty strong evidence. I didn't see it on that play." Fox Sports analyst Mike Pereira added his thoughts on the play, saying, "I don't agree he made a football move, certainly not in the context of the rule. He's going to the ground, the ball pops out then. Nobody likes this rule...but it wasn't a [touchdown] by the rule."

The Packers would go on to lose the NFC Championship game 28–22 to the Seattle Seahawks.

The Cowboys and Packers would meet again in the NFC Divisional round in the 2016 playoffs. With Dallas trailing 28–13 after the 3rd quarter, touchdown passes to Jason Witten and Bryant by rookie quarterback Dak Prescott, tied the game at 28–28. In the 4th quarter, field goals by Crosby and Bailey once again tied the game at 31–31 with 35 seconds left to go, with the Packers' offense getting the ball. Rodgers, after taking a blindside sack, passed deep to Jared Cook, who made a sideline catch at the Dallas 32, just being able to keep his feet in-bounds, which set up a successful game-winning 51-yard field goal by Crosby as time expired. And again, the Cowboys could not beat the Packers, as they lost 34–31.

McCarthy was fired as the Packers' head coach during the 2018 season after losing 20–17 at home to the Arizona Cardinals. The Packers hired Matt LaFleur as their next head coach in the offseason. After the Cowboys' 2019 season, where the team finished 8–8 and missed the playoffs, they declined to renew head coach Jason Garrett's contract, and hired McCarthy to be their head coach.

Rule change 
Prior to 2018, Article 3 in the NFL Rulebook stated that:
The rule was nicknamed the "Calvin Johnson Rule" after a Week 1 game in the 2010 NFL season between the Chicago Bears and the Detroit Lions which also involved referee Gene Steratore controversially overturning a potential game winning catch for the Lions by Johnson upon further review.

This was hotly debated for years, until March 2018, when the NFL announced it would work to change their catch rule. Kevin Seifert of ESPN reported, "the NFL competition committee appears to have unanimous agreement that controversial catch rulings involving Dez Bryant and Calvin Johnson should have been ruled complete, according to Giants owner John Mara. So the committee is working on changing the rule to relax the 'going to the ground' requirement." On July 23, 2015, the rule was officially changed to state as follows:

With the change, the rule takes out the process of making a "football move" in order to complete a catch. Dean Blandino discussed the new rule, saying, "For years the requirement for a catch is control, both feet and after that the receiver had to have the ball long enough to perform a [football] act. It was that act common to the game, football move, that created some confusion."

Starting lineups

Officials 
 Referee: Gene Steratore (#114)
 Umpire: Bill Schuster (#129)
 Head Linesman: Dana McKenzie (#8)
 Line Judge: Rusty Baynes (#59)
 Back Judge: Todd Prukop (#30)
 Side Judge: Tom Hill (#97)
 Field Judge: Terry Brown (#43)
Replay Official: Bill Spyksma

See also 
 Cowboys–Packers rivalry

References

External links 
 
 Pro Football Reference page for the game

2014 National Football League season
National Football League playoff games
National Football League controversies
Dallas Cowboys postseason
Green Bay Packers postseason
American football incidents
2015 in sports in Wisconsin
January 2015 sports events in the United States
Nicknamed sporting events